Öz is a Turkish surname. Notable people with the surname include:
 Doğan Öz (1934–1978), Turkish prosecutor assassinated during his investigation of the Turkish deep state.
 Emanuel Öz (born 1979), Swedish politician
 Mehmet Öz, Turkish-American surgeon, author and promoter of alternative medicine.

Turkish-language surnames